Saughall is a former civil parish now in the parishes of Saughall and Shotwick Park, Puddington and the unparished area of Chester, in Cheshire West and Chester, England.  It contains eleven buildings that are recorded in the National Heritage List for England as designated listed buildings, all of which are listed at Grade II.  This grade is the lowest of the three gradings given to listed buildings and is applied to "buildings of national importance and special interest".  The parish contains the village of Saughall, and is otherwise rural.  Most of the listed buildings are houses and associated structures.  The others include a former inn, a former windmill, a church, and two guideposts.

References
Citations

Sources

Listed buildings in Cheshire West and Chester
Lists of listed buildings in Cheshire